Events during the year 1943 in  Northern Ireland.

Incumbents
 Governor - 	 The Duke of Abercorn 
 Prime Minister - J. M. Andrews (until 1 May), Basil Brooke (from 1 May)

Events
9 February – The Belfast West by-election is won by the Northern Ireland Labour Party candidate Jack Beattie
1 May – Sir Basil Brooke becomes Prime Minister of Northern Ireland.
17 June – British aircraft carrier  is launched at the Harland and Wolff shipyard in Belfast.
29 July – Cruiser  is launched at the Harland and Wolff shipyard in Belfast to British Admiralty order.
27 November – British aircraft carrier  is launched at the Harland and Wolff shipyard in Belfast by Lady Brooke.

Arts and literature
Release of the Crown Film Unit drama documentary short A Letter From Ulster directed by Brian Desmond Hurst assisted by William MacQuitty.
Roy McFadden's poetry Swords and Ploughshares is published.
John Luke paints Pax.

Sport

Football
Irish League
Winners: Linfield

Irish Cup
Winners: Belfast Celtic 1 - 0 Glentoran

Births
18 February – George Campbell, politician in Australia.
27 February – Jimmy Nicholson, footballer.
10 March – Eamonn McCann, journalist and political activist.
8 April – Tony Banks, Baron Stratford, politician (died 2006).
16 April – Tom Lewis, singer-songwriter.
14 May – John Cushnie, gardener and broadcaster (died 2009).
22 May – Betty Williams, peace campaigner, recipient of the Nobel Peace Prize (died 2020).
18 June – Willie Irvine, footballer.
15 July – Jocelyn Bell Burnell, astrophysicist.
21 July – Henry McCullough, guitarist.
15 August – Eileen Bell, Alliance Party MLA.
31 October – Stephen Rea, actor.

Full date unknown
Billy Brown, musician and artist (died 1999).
Kenneth Montgomery, conductor.

Deaths
19 July – Robert Alexander, rugby and cricket player (born 1910).

See also
1943 in Scotland
1943 in Wales

References